Novomusino (Yañı Musa) is a rural locality (a village) in Staromusinsky Selsoviet, Karmaskalinsky District, Bashkortostan, Russia. The population was 233 as of 2010.

Geography 
It is located 19 km from Karmaskaly and 1 km from Staromusino.

References 

Rural localities in Karmaskalinsky District